Hillsboro Independent School District is a public school district based in Hillsboro, Texas (USA).

In addition to Hillsboro, the district also serves a portion of Carl's Corner.

In 2011, the school district was rated "Recognized" by the Texas Education Agency.

Schools
Hillsboro High (Grades 9-12)
Hillsboro Junior High (Grades 6-8)
Hillsboro Intermediate (Grades 3-5)
Hillsboro Elementary (Grades K-2)
Franklin Elementary (Grades PK)

References

External links
 

School districts in Hill County, Texas